Hegau-Gymnasium is a gymnasium in Singen in the very south of Baden-Württemberg in southern Germany. The school is named after the extinct Hegau volcanic landscape.

History
The school was founded in 1899. In 1934, the school was renamed Langemarck-Realgymnasium, named after the location of the World War I Battle of Langemarck. It was one of the earliest schools renamed in the era of National Socialism in Germany. From the end of the war until Feb.25th, 1946, the school building was requisitioned by the French occupying forces.
Today Hegau-Gymnasium has a so-called Abi-Bac section and boasts the title of "Partner School for Europe".

Students
 Volker Kauder (*1949), member of the German Bundestag
 Egon Mayer (1917–1944), German World War II fighter pilot

References
Citations

Bibliography

 Egger, Bernadette (2013). Das Archiv des Hegau-Gymnasiums, in: Singen Jahrbuch 2013. .
 Märtin, Antje et al. (2001). Jahr100Buch Jubiläumsschrift Hegau-Gymnasium Singen 
 Rombach, Klaus (1992). Schulwirklichkeit in Singen – Von der Bürgerschule zur Oberschule – Die Höhere Schule 1899–1945 – Eine Dokumentation. Konstanz, Germany: Hartung-Gorre Verlag. .

External links

1899 establishments in Germany
Gymnasiums in Germany
Schools in Baden-Württemberg